The Aviation and Maritime Investigation Authority (AMIA, LNVÚ) is the accident and incident investigation authority of Slovakia for aviation and nautical matters. It is an independent part of the Ministry of Transport, Construction, and Regional Development. Its head office is in the Ministry of Transport offices in Bratislava.

Previously, the Civil Aviation Inspectorate Slovak Republic (Štátna letecká inšpekcia SR) conducted investigations on aviation accidents and incidents.

See also

 Civil Aviation Authority (Slovakia)

References

External links
 Aviation and Maritime Investigation Authority 

Government of Slovakia
Slovakia
Aviation organisations based in Slovakia
Maritime safety organizations